Per-Arne Brostedt (born 9 January 1958) is a Swedish professional golfer, member of the winning Swedish team at the 1986 Europcar Cup, a special event on the European Tour. He was 1984 and 1985 Swedish PGA Champion and won the Swedish Golf Tour Order of Merit in 1985 and 1986.

Amateur career
17 years old, Brostedt won the 1975 District Championship in the Swedish capital of Stockholm. Three years later, as an invited amateur, Brostedt finished tied 4th at the professional tournament Flygt Open at his home course Viksjö Golf Club north of Stockholm, in June 1978.

Professional career
Brostedt turned professional later in 1978 and played on the growing professional golf circuit in Sweden. He played on the Asia Golf Circuit the 1982–83 season and finished 21st on the money rankings. His best finish was 5th at the 1983 Indian Open. In January 1983, he became the first Swede to play in a tournament on the PGA Tour, after qualifying for the 1983 Phoenix Open.

In 1984, Brostedt played in his first major championship, The 113th Open Championship at the Old Course in St Andrews, Scotland, were he missed the 36-hole cut. From the 1984 season, the Swedish Golf Tour was established and Brostedt won five tournaments the first three seasons, including the Swedish PGA Championship in 1984 and 1985. In 1985 and 1986 he won the Swedish Golf Tour Order of Merit.

In 1986 he was part of the winning Swedish team at the Europcar Cup in Biarritz, France, together with Anders Forsbrand, Magnus Grankvist and Magnus Sunesson.

His best season on the European Tour was in 1987 when he played in The Open Championship at Muirfield. He also finished tied 18th at the PLM Open and tied 21st at the Scandinavian Enterprise Open, both on home soil. He finished 149th on the 1987 European Tour Order of Merit.

In 1993 Brostedt won the annual Swedish Married Couple Championship, a 36-hole foursome held in Sunne, with his wife at the time, Charlotte Montgomery, who herself was a professional golfer and played on the LPGA Tour 1982–1987. Together they ran a Golf Academy in Stockholm in the early 1990s.
 
Brostedt turned 50 in January 2008 and attempted to qualify for the European Senior Tour, but played only in the PGA Seniors Championship at Slaley Hall where he finished tied 77th. He finished ninth in the Q-School and joined the European Senior Tour in 2009, where he made 7 cuts in 8 starts.

Professional wins (10)

Swedish Golf Tour wins (5)

Sources:

Other wins (3)
1982 Marbella Invest Classic (Albatross GC, Sweden)
1983 Scania Open (Södertälje GC, Sweden), Kvällsposten Masters (Bokskogen GC, Sweden)

Senior wins (2)
2011 Swedish PGA Senior Club Pro Championship
2014 Swedish PGA Senior Club Pro Championship

Results in major championships

Note: Brostedt only played in The Open Championship.

CUT = missed the half-way cut

Team appearances
Professional
Europcar Cup (representing Sweden): 1986 (winners)
Source:

References

External links

Swedish male golfers
European Tour golfers
Golfers from Stockholm
1958 births
Living people
20th-century Swedish people